Torah Educational Software (TES) is a distributor of Judaic software based in Jerusalem. Its product Let's Keep Kosher received a rabbinical endorsement.

Software for Jewish texts
 A 1996 followup to a 1994 Davka-vs-TES (Torah Educational Software) comparison of Jewish texts on CD-ROM began by listing the winner: "The competition ... has led to an apparent winner: the consumer!"
 A University of California Press 34 page overview of tools for Talmudic study, especially related to Daf Yomi, gives Artscroll top billing, but in the area of non-print and non-voice, TES is noted for its Gemara Tutor and Talmud Master software.
 Dagesh is the name of their multi-language wordprocessing program, including Hebrew, English, Russian, and Arabic; Dagesh-Pro Translator is bi-directional for Hebrew and English.

See also
 Bar Ilan Responsa Project
 Nonviolent video game#Jewish games

References

External links
 Torah Tots' Parsha on Parade (an Oct. 2000 review of TES' CD)

Judaism software
Educational software
Educational software companies